Pat Cash and Todd Martin won the title by defeating brothers John and Patrick McEnroe in the final in three sets.

Draw

External links
Draw sheet
Final result

2014 US Open (tennis)